Zuzana Kocumová (born 26 May 1979) is a Czech cross-country skier who competed from 1996 to 2001. At the 1998 Winter Olympics in Nagano, she finished sixth in the 4 × 5 km relay, 35th in the 30 km event, 41st in the 5 km + 10 km combined pursuit and 59th in the 5 km event.

Kocumová's best result at the FIS Nordic World Ski Championships was 23rd twice (1997: 5 km + 10 km combined pursuit, 2001: 15 km). Her best World Cup result was 12th in an individual sprint event in Switzerland in 2000.

Kocumová earned three individual victories at lower-level events up to 15 km from 1998 to 2001.

Kocumova won the female 2015 Spartan World Championships in Lake Tahoe, California.

Cross-country skiing results
All results are sourced from the International Ski Federation (FIS).

Olympic Games

World Championships

a.  Cancelled due to extremely cold weather.

World Cup

Season standings

References

External links

Women's 4 × 5 km cross-country relay Olympic results: 1976–2002 

1979 births
Czech female cross-country skiers
Cross-country skiers at the 1998 Winter Olympics
Olympic cross-country skiers of the Czech Republic
Sportspeople from Liberec
Living people